Kaleb McGary (born February 22, 1995) is an American football offensive tackle for the Atlanta Falcons of the National Football League (NFL). He played college football at Washington.

Early years
McGary originally attended Battle Ground High School in Battle Ground, Washington as a freshman before transferring to Fife High School in Fife, Washington. He played offensive line, tight end and defensive line in high school. He committed to the University of Washington to play college football.

College career
McGary played at Washington from 2014 to 2018. During his collegiate career, he started 47 of 53 games. As a senior, he won the Morris Trophy.

Professional career

McGary was drafted by the Atlanta Falcons with the 31st overall pick in the first round of the 2019 NFL Draft. The Falcons traded up from the second round with the Los Angeles Rams to acquire the selection used to draft McGary. After splitting reps with Ty Sambrailo at right tackle in Week 1 against the Minnesota Vikings, McGary was named the Falcons starting right tackle. As a rookie, he started all 16 games for the Falcons in the 2019 season.

McGary started 13 of 16 games in 2020 for the Falcons. He was injured in week 2 against Dallas and left the game. He would sit out the next game but return to the starting lineup in Week 4 versus Green Bay. McGary was unavailable for Atlanta's Week 14 loss to the Chargers, and had missed five consecutive practices while attending to a family matter.

On May 2, 2022, the Falcons declined to pick up the fifth year option on McGary's contract, making him a free agent after the season.

In 2023, McGary signed a 3 year deal with the Falcons worth 34.5 million.

References

External links
Atlanta Falcons bio
Washington Huskies bio

1995 births
Living people
People from Pierce County, Washington
Players of American football from Washington (state)
Sportspeople from the Seattle metropolitan area
American football offensive tackles
Washington Huskies football players
Atlanta Falcons players